Mukhran Machavariani (April 12, 1929 – May 17, 2010) was a Georgian poet, a member of the Supreme Council of the Republic of Georgia (Georgian Parliament) from 1990 until 1992, and a recipient of the Shota Rustaveli State Prize of Georgia.  From 1988 until 1990 he was the Chairman of the Union of Georgian Writers.  He died during a performance at Rustaveli Theater.

Education 
In 1954 graduation at the Philology Department of Ivane Javakhishvili Tbilisi University.

Works 
 Poems (1955), 
 The Red Sun and the Green Grass
 Silence Without You (1958).

 Translations
 Boy, Don't Embarrass Me! 
 Extraordinary by Its Ordinariness 
 100 Poems

External links

References 

1929 births
2010 deaths
Burials at Mtatsminda Pantheon
Male poets from Georgia (country)
Communist Party of Georgia (Soviet Union) politicians
Rustaveli Prize winners
Members of the Congress of People's Deputies of the Soviet Union
20th-century poets from Georgia (country)
20th-century male writers